Antonis Mantzaris (alternate spelling: Antonios) (born 20 June 1986) is a Greek professional basketball player and coach. He is 1.93 m (6'4") tall. He can play at the shooting guard and small forward positions.

Professional career
Mantzaris begin his pro career with the Greek Basket League club Peristeri in 2004. He moved to AEK Athens in 2011.

National team career
As a member of the Greek junior national teams, Mantzaris played at the 2004 FIBA Europe Under-18 Championship and at the 2006 FIBA Europe Under-20 Championship.

Personal life
Mantzaris' brother, Vangelis Mantzaris, is also a professional basketball player.

References

External links
Eurobasket.com Profile
FIBA Europe Profile
Greek Basket League Profile 
AEK.com Profile

1986 births
Living people
AEK B.C. players
Ethnikos Piraeus B.C. players
Greek men's basketball players
Greek basketball coaches
Greek Basket League players
Panelefsiniakos B.C. players
Peristeri B.C. players
Psychiko B.C. players
Shooting guards
Small forwards
Basketball players from Athens